This is a list of total public and private health expenditure for European countries, divided by the population of the country to give expenditure per capita. It includes health services, family planning, nutrition activities, and emergency health aid.

Map 

The table uses 2013 data from the World Bank. Numbers are in international dollars.

Health expense per person by European country 
The table uses an interval of years from the World Bank. Numbers are in international dollars.

Health expense per person by  transcontinental country
The following list transcontinental countries that have main territories in Asia with small territories in Europe.

The table uses an interval of years from the World Bank. Numbers are in international dollars.

See also

Plotted maps
European countries by electricity consumption per person
European countries by employment in agriculture (% of employed)
European countries by fossil fuel use (% of total energy)
European countries by military expenditure as a percentage of government expenditure
European countries by percent of population aged 0-14
European countries by percentage of urban population
European countries by percentage of women in national parliaments
List of sovereign states in Europe by life expectancy
List of sovereign states in Europe by number of Internet users

References

External links 

countries by health expense per person
Health expense
Lists of countries by per capita values